Who is Running? ( or Ta fa likit) is a 1997 Thai drama film directed by Oxide Pang Chun. The directorial debut of Oxide Pang, it was Thailand's official entry to the Academy Awards in 1998.

Cast
Sanya Kunakorn as Jiab 
Nattarika Thumpridanun as Wan 
Suchao Pongwilai   
Vichitra Triyakul
Asa Hasin
Yawtchai Phaikhayaat

See also
List of submissions to the 71st Academy Awards for Best Foreign Language Film
List of Thai submissions for the Academy Award for Best Foreign Language Film

References

External links

1997 drama films
Films directed by Oxide Pang
1997 directorial debut films
Thai drama films